Leo Chiachio and Daniel Giannone, better known as Chiachio & Giannone (born in 1969 and 1964 respectively), are a gay art collective from Argentina.

Biography 
Leo Chiachio was born in Buenos Aires, Argentina, in 1969, while Daniel Giannone was born in Cordoba, Argentina in 1964. They met at a friend's house in 2003 and have collaborated on art ever since. Their artwork is primarily fabric-based textiles and embroidery, with the occasional gouache painting. Their aim is to replicate the principals of painting, but by using thread.

As a gay art collective, Chiachio & Giannone have held several LGBT+ projects to advocate for the community. Most involve community members contributing a piece of cloth with an encouraging message, which is then sewn into a larger project or mosaic. These mosaics have been displayed in several cities, most notably the Celebrating Diversity flag, which traveled from Argentina to Long Beach, California.

Education 
Leo Chiachio studied studio art at the National School of Fine Arts "Prilidiano Pueyrredon" and at the Superior School of Fine Arts “Ernesto de La Cárcova”.

Community projects 
Chiachio and Giannone have hosted a number of participatory art projects and community events intended to celebrate and promote the LGBT+ community.

LATINX Flag Project 
Workshops were held at the Museum of Contemporary Art in San Diego, California; at The Front Arte & Cultura in San Ysidro, California; and at The Studio Door in San Diego, California in 2020. In these workshops, participants were given a piece of reused cloth that came in the color of the trans flag or the pride flag, which they then decorated with encouraging messages, notably LGBT and Latinx acceptance messages. The pieces were then sewn together by Chiachio & Giannone into a large mosaic, with the text LATINX written over it.

Celebrating Diversity Project 
This project that took place at Chiachio & Giannone's Museum of Latin American Art residency from March to May 2019. The artwork is a 120-foot long flag made of textile, and consists of messages from over 3,500 people in the LGBT+ community. The aim was to have the participants decorate a piece of cloth with symbols, words, or phrases that reflect the meaning of diversity and acceptance. The banner was later exhibited at the Long Beach Pride Parade and at the Pride at the Port event in San Pedro, California.

Collections 
Chiachio & Giannone's art is in the permanent collections of several museums, including in the Buenos Aires Museum of Modern Art, the Museum of Contemporary Art of Rosario, the Caraffa Fine Arts Museum, and at the Juan B. Castagnino Fine Arts Museum.

Exhibitions

References 

Argentine gay artists
Artist groups and collectives
Textile artists
Argentine contemporary artists
Art duos
Embroiderers